Yelena Aleksandrovna Donskaya (28 October 1915 – 29 March 2016) was a Soviet sport shooter who was World Champion three times and European Champion seven times.

References

External links
 Как живешь, ветеран
 Елена Донская: Продолжаю врачебную и тренерскую деятельность

1915 births
2016 deaths
Soviet female sport shooters
Russian female sport shooters
Honoured Masters of Sport of the USSR
Soviet people of World War II
Russian centenarians
Women centenarians